Václav Kopecký (27 August 1897 – 5 August 1961) was a Czechoslovak Communist politician, journalist and chief ideologue of the Communist Party of Czechoslovakia during the leadership of Klement Gottwald. A high-ranking member of the party since the interwar era, he spent World War II in Moscow and served as minister of culture and information in the postwar government. Kopecký was noted for his antisemitic statements, criticizing Jews for Zionism and cosmopolitanism; he also stage-managed the Slánský trial.

Early career
He had a proletarian upringing as the thirteenth child of a small tradesman and Sokol official. He joined the Communist Party of Czechoslovakia in 1921. During the interwar period, Kopecký was a member of the underground Karlín communist cell along with future party leaders Klement Gottwald and Rudolf Slánský. From 1940 to 1941, Kopecký was a representative of the Comintern, spending World War II in the Soviet Union. In July 1944, he voiced the sentiments of the emerging Communist consensus on postwar nationality issues, which rejected Communist internationalism and accepted the Czechoslovak government-in-exile's plans for national homogenization via the expulsion of Sudeten Germans. Expressing hope that the Jewish question would "forever disappear... as a decoy for reactionary elements", Kopecký declared:

Minister

He served as the Minister of Culture and Information in the postwar Czechoslovak government. As Minister of Information, Kopecký surrounded himself with Communist sympathizing artists. Czech poet František Halas led the ministry's publishing department; writer Ivan Olbracht headed the radio department; visual artist Adolf Hoffmeister the foreign affairs department; and a film department by Vítězslav Nezval. Under Kopecký's leadership, the Ministry of Information adapted the Nazi government's management of book publication under the guise of needing to replace the books destroyed during the Nazi occupation. Publishers had to submit their books to the publishing department of the Ministry of Information half a year in advance for review. This process did not initially involve ideological censorship and was aimed at freeing writers from the demands of the free market. After the death of Jan Masaryk, Kopecký instructed the media not to mention Masaryk's name.

According to Czech historian Michal Frankl, Kopecký "distinguished himself with antisemitic diatribes," criticizing the presence of Jews in politics and attacking Zionism and cosmopolitanism. In 1945, he accused the "Jewish super-rich like Petschek, Weinmann, Rothschild, Gutman" of "blood-sucking" and argued that wealthy Jews could not live in the people's democracy. He also objected to the resettlement of Jews from Carpathian Ruthenia in postwar Czechoslovakia. For Rudolf Slánský's fiftieth birthday in July 1951, Kopecký lauded him in the party newspaper Rudé právo and claimed that "already at home and at primary school [Slánský] absorbed a full-blooded native Czechness". Despite their former association, Kopecký became a personal enemy of Slánský and was involved in the Slánský trial as one of the main stage managers of the show trial. In December 1951, he complained that many of the alleged conspirators "come from wealthy Jewish families" and that "the great part of people with a Jewish origin" subscribe to "cosmopolitan thinking". According to Kopecký, this demonstrated that the party was not taking the anti-cosmopolitan campaign seriously enough and was underestimating the "very serious danger" posed by Zionism. Historian Karel Kaplan described Kopecký as "the party ideologue of show trials".

Later life and career 
On January 31, 1953 Václav Kopecký became deputy prime minister in the Antonín Zápotocký government and took over this office on March 21, 1953 in the first government Viliam Široký in which on September 14, 1953 became first deputy prime minister. He was also Minister of Culture in the Široký government from September 14, 1953 to December 12, 1954. He also took over the post of Deputy Prime Minister in the second Široký government.

Kopecký resigned from government positions on December 12, 1954. However, he remained a member of the Presidium of the Central Committee of the Communist Party of Ukraine and retained a strong party influence. Kopecký adhered to a Stalinist line, trying to keep the party in the positions of the Gottwald period under the new conditions.

Václav Kopecký died in Prague on 5 August 1961 of a pulmonary embolism. He was given a state funeral.

References

Further reading
 

1897 births
1961 deaths
People from Kosmonosy
People from the Kingdom of Bohemia
Members of the Central Committee of the Communist Party of Czechoslovakia
Government ministers of Czechoslovakia
Members of the Chamber of Deputies of Czechoslovakia (1929–1935)
Members of the Chamber of Deputies of Czechoslovakia (1935–1939)
Members of the Interim National Assembly of Czechoslovakia
Members of the Constituent National Assembly of Czechoslovakia
Members of the National Assembly of Czechoslovakia (1948–1954)
Members of the National Assembly of Czechoslovakia (1954–1960)
Members of the National Assembly of Czechoslovakia (1960–1964)
Charles University alumni